Garten der Unbewusstheit is the fifth album by Japanese doom metal band Corrupted, released on August 20, 2011. It was released 5 years after El mundo frio, marking the longest gap between 2 albums.

Track listing

References

Corrupted (band) albums
2011 albums